Mobile object may refer to:

 Mob (video gaming), a computer-controlled non-player character (NPC) in a computer game such as an MMORPG or MUD
 Mobile agent, a composition of computer software and data that is able to migrate (move) from one computer to another autonomously and continue its execution on the destination computer